Oscar Raúl Bidegain (3 September 1905 – 15 December 1994) was an Argentine peronist politician, sport shooter and surgeon. He was Governor of Buenos Aires Province from 1973 to 1974. He also competed in the 50 m pistol event at the 1948 Summer Olympics.

Bidegain's election as governor was largely thanks to the campaign of Tendencia Revolucionaria. Bidegain reciprocated by proclaiming amnesty for some incarcerated members of Tendencia Revolucionaria, a move his Peronist ally Héctor Cámpora also promised as part of his presidential campaign. However Bidegain's running mate and subsequent vicegovernor Victorio Calabró was disliked by Tendencia Revolucionaria. He was seen as a right-wing bureaucratic syndicalist.

On January 20, 1974 People's Revolutionary Army attacked the Azul garrison resulting in Perón criticizing Bidegain who resigned after being pressured by the Camber of Deputies. Victorio Calabró succeeded him as governor.

References

External links
 Compañero Oscar Raúl Bidegain ¡ Presente 

1905 births
1994 deaths
Governors of Buenos Aires Province
Argentine male sport shooters
Argentine people of Basque descent
Olympic shooters of Argentina
Shooters at the 1948 Summer Olympics
Pan American Games medalists in shooting
Pan American Games silver medalists for Argentina
Shooters at the 1951 Pan American Games
Shooters at the 1955 Pan American Games
Medalists at the 1951 Pan American Games